French v Barclays Bank plc [1998] EWCA Civ 1092 is a UK labour law case concerning the contract of employment. It held that changing a staff manual can breach the term of mutual trust and confidence that is implied into every individual contract of employment, and a unilateral change to a workplace practice can breach that contract.

Facts
Mr French was meant to relocate from Oxfordshire to Essex. He needed to sell his family home in Radley and buy another in Billericay. The staff manual at Barclays Bank plc said he would get a discretionary interest free bridging loan to let him complete the purchase of a new house before selling the old one. But, sadly, the housing market collapsed. By October 1989 the valuers said the Radley house was worth £150,000, when he had been trying to sell it for £195,000. The bank changed its policy and withdrew the loan. Mr French argued that withdrawal of the loan was a breach of contract. Lord Lester QC represented Mr French.

Judgment
Waller LJ held that the loan scheme was non-contractual and discretionary. Nevertheless the withdrawal of the scheme was likely to destroy trust and confidence. Accordingly unilaterally changing the workplace practice was a breach of the implied term of mutual trust and confidence.

Walker LJ and Hobhouse LJ agreed.

See also

UK labour law
Employment contract in English law
Autoclenz Ltd v Belcher [2011] UKSC 41

Notes

References

United Kingdom labour case law
Court of Appeal (England and Wales) cases
1998 in case law
1998 in British law
Barclays litigation
United Kingdom employment contract case law